The Benue State Polytechnic is a tertiary education institute in Ugbokolo, Okpokwu LGA, Benue State, Nigeria. The current Rector is  Dr. Usman David Kuti. It was originally known as the Murtala College of Arts, Science and Technology, established in 1977 by the military governor of Benue State, Colonel Abdullahi Shelleng (1976–1978).
In 1983, the college's Department of Agriculture of the College was merged with Akperan Orshi College of Agriculture.
The school is approved as a state-owned polytechnic by the National Board for Technical Education.

Following violence elsewhere in Benue State in March 2006, during a peaceful student protest at the polytechnic about a student killing and against increase in fees, the chairman of Okpokwu Local Government urged students not to take the law into their own hands. At the 29th Matriculation Ceremony of new students later that month the rector urged students to shun all social ills.
In November 2008 the polytechnic's school of Business and Management Studies organized its first annual national conference with the theme: Imperatives of Prudent Resources Management in Nigeria for Sustainable Development.

Schools and Departments 
The following are the schools and departments of the institution;  

School of Art, Design and Printing  

Department of Fine Art
 Department of Industrial Design
Department of Printing Technology  

School of Business and Management Studies

Department of Accounting
 Department of Marketing
Department of Banking and Finance
Department of Office technology and management
Department of Business Admin and management

School of Engineering Technology

 Department of Civil Engineering technology
 Department of Mechanical Engineering Technology  
 Department of welding and fabricating Engineering Technology
 Department of Electrical/Electronic Engineering Technology

School of general and preliminary studies

 Department of Library and Information Science
 Department of Preliminary studies
 Department of Mass Communication

School of administrative and vocational studies

 Department of Legal Studies
 Department of Local Government and Community Development
 Department of Public Administration
Department of Public accounting/Audit
 

School of Environmental Studies  

 Department of Building Technology  
 Department of Architectural Technology  
 Department of Surveying and Geo-informatics  
 Department of Estate Management  

School of Technology  

 Department of Computer science  
 Department of Hospitality Management

See also
List of polytechnics in Nigeria

References

Polytechnics in Nigeria
Education in Benue State
1977 establishments in Nigeria
Public universities in Nigeria
Educational institutions established in 1977